The Belouni (Gaulish: *Belounoi, earlier *Belomnoi, 'the strong, powerful') were a Gallic tribe dwelling on the eastern shore of Lake Garda during the Roman period.

Name 
They are mentioned as Beloúnōn (Βελούνων; var. Βεκουνῶν, Βενουχῶν) by Ptolemy (2nd c. AD).

The ethnic name Belouni is a latinized form of the Gaulish *Belounoi, deriving from the stem belo-, meaning 'strong, powerful'.

Geography 
The Belouni lived on the eastern shore of Lake Garda. Their territory was located north of the Arusnates, east of the Benacenses and Stoeni, south of the Tublinates, west of the Dripsinates and Misquilenses.

References

Bibliography 

Historical Celtic peoples
Gauls